

Hope Academy of Bishkek (HAB) is an international primary and secondary school in Bishkek, Kyrgyzstan. It was founded in 1998 by a group of expatriate parents and provides an English language education, primarily for children of expatriate volunteer families in Kyrgyzstan.

Demographics 
Hope Academy has approximately 170 students from preschool through 12th grade, representing 22 nationalities.  The largest single student group is from South Korea. The staff come from approximately 15 countries. The largest single group is from Kyrgyzstan, followed by the United States.

Academics 
The school offers the following subjects for grades 1-12: Language Arts, Kyrgyz History and Culture, Math, Social Studies, Science, Ethics, Russian, Korean, German, Kyrgyz, ESL, Physical Education, Art, Music, Library, and Computer Skills. The average class size is about 14 students per grade.

At the Secondary School Level, HAB offers a college preparatory program, preparing students for the IGCSE and AP exams.

Extracurricular Activities 
Hope Academy takes part in the Central Asian Basketball Classic, the Central Asian Soccer Classic, and the Central Asian Cross Country Classic. It has annual dramatic productions, service projects, and clubs.

Accreditation 
Hope Academy is accredited with the New England Association of Schools and Colleges (NEASC) through the Commission on International Schools Abroad (CAISA). 
Hope Academy is a member of the Association of Christian Schools International (ACSI).

References

"Hope Academy Official School Profile"
"European School of Central Asia's Table of International Schools in Bishkek

External links

Official site
School Profile
List of International Schools in Bishkek

Educational institutions established in 1998
International schools in Kyrgyzstan
1998 establishments in Kyrgyzstan
Schools in Bishkek